Jens Castrop (born 29 July 2003) is a German professional footballer who plays a midfielder for 2. Bundesliga club 1. FC Nürnberg, on loan from 1. FC Köln. He is of South Korean descent.

Club career
A native of Düsseldorf, Castrop began his career in the youth academy of Fortuna Düsseldorf. In 2015, he transferred to the academy of Düsseldorf's rival, 1.FC Köln, where he played for the club's U15 and U17 teams. In August 2020, Castrop was promoted to the club's first team by manager Markus Gisdol. He also signed a long-term professional contract until June 2023. 

In January 2022, it was announced that Castrop would join 1. FC Nürnberg on a loan deal.

International career
Castrop is a youth international for Germany.

References

External links

Living people
2003 births
Footballers from Düsseldorf
German people of South Korean descent
1. FC Köln players
1. FC Köln II players
1. FC Nürnberg players
Association football midfielders
2. Bundesliga players
Germany youth international footballers
German footballers
1. FC Nürnberg II players